Per Otto Gustaf Rathsman (14 August 1917 – 15 June 1986) was a Swedish diplomat.

Early life
Rathsman was born on 14 August 1917 in Ljung, Linköping Municipality, Sweden, the son of vicar Otto Rathsman and his wife Sara (née Svensson). He passed studentexamen in Linköping in 1936 and received a Candidate of Law degree from Uppsala University in 1939 before becoming an attaché at the Ministry for Foreign Affairs in 1940.

Career
Rathsman served in New York City in 1942, Washington, D.C. in 1943, Buenos Aires in 1945 and was First Secretary there in 1950. He was First Legation Secretary in London in 1950, First Secretary in 1953, First Legation Secretary in Ottawa in 1953, and First Secretary in 1957. While serving as First Secretary in Ottawa, Rathsman was en route to Stockholm on 25 July 1956 for a two-month vacation when the eastbound MS Stockholm collided with westbound Italian ocean liner . He suffered only a minor head injury.

The year after, Rathsman became Director at the Swedish Foreign Ministry and in 1959 he became Embassy Counsellor in New Delhi. He became Consul (with the title of Consul-general) in Nairobi in 1962 and he was Ambassador in Nairobi, also accredited to Dar es Salaam, Kampala and Lusaka from 1962 to 1966 and Caracas, also accredited to Santo Domingo and Port of Spain from 1966 to 1970. After that he was Ambassador in Bucharest from 1970 to 1973, Baghdad from 1973 to 1975, Consul-general in São Paulo from 1976 to 1980 and Consul-general in San Francisco from 1980 to 1982. Before retiring, Rathsman was mediator in the Neutral Nations Supervisory Commission in Korea from 1 April 1982 to 31 March 1983 with the rank of major general.

Personal life
Rathsman was married twice. He was married the first time 1944–1954 to Ulla Wennerberg (born 1921), daughter of John Wennerberg and Karin (née Cederberg). He married a second time in 1955 with Gunilla Beskow (born 1927), daughter of the engineer Fritz Beskow and Rut (née Mellander). He had three children in his first marriage; Ulf (born 1945), Lena (born 1947) and Katarina (born 1949) and two children in his second marriage; Otto (born 1956) and Peter (born 1957).

Rathsman died on 15 June 1986 and was buried in Skogskyrkogården in Stockholm on 21 July 1986.

Awards and decorations
Commander of the Order of the Falcon
Officer of the Order of Orange-Nassau
Knight of the Order of Civil Merit
Knight of the Order of the Aztec Eagle

References

1917 births
1986 deaths
Consuls-general of Sweden
Ambassadors of Sweden to Kenya
Ambassadors of Sweden to Tanzania
Ambassadors of Sweden to Uganda
Ambassadors of Sweden to Zambia
Ambassadors of Sweden to Venezuela
Ambassadors of Sweden to the Dominican Republic
Ambassadors of Sweden to Haiti
Ambassadors of Sweden to Romania
Ambassadors of Sweden to Iraq
People from Linköping Municipality
Uppsala University alumni
Burials at Skogskyrkogården